Simon Milenko (born 24 November 1988) is an Australian cricketer. He plays for Tasmania and the Hobart Hurricanes. After making his first class debut for Queensland in 2014–15, he did not play any Sheffield Shield games for them in the 2015–16 season, so he moved to Tasmania to pursue further opportunities. On 7 December 2019, in the 2019–20 Sheffield Shield season, Milenko scored his maiden century in first-class cricket.

References

1988 births
Living people
Australian cricketers
Queensland cricketers
Cricketers from Sydney
Brisbane Heat cricketers
Hobart Hurricanes cricketers